The modern Saudi theatre traces its beginnings with the foundation of the current Saudi Arabia state. However, the Hijaz play in Medina was established during the Turkish Ottoman era. A popular theatre, frequently including dance, Arabic Poetry. Theatre activities are still popular today in the kingdom. Saudi theatre has
existed in and been produced by several establishments such as schools, universities, governmental sectors, and private sectors.

History of Saudi theatre

The history of the Theatrical activities in the Kingdom of Saudi Arabia back to 1928 when the first play entitled "Dialogue between the ignorant and uneducated" performed in Qassim in front of King Abdulaziz
. There were theatrical activities were also very active during the Ottoman in Hijaz. Ministry of Culture and Information is one of the several organizations that have been established throughout the country to preserve and sponsors the Saudi theater.  The Saudi Arabian Society for Culture and Arts, The King Fahd Cultural Center, and King Abdulaziz Center for World Culture also sponsors the Saudi theater activities in the kingdom.

Venues

There are several theaters in the kingdom. The Theater of King Fahd Cultural Center in Riyadh is considered the largest theater in Saudi Arabia with the largest number of seats that serve more than 3000 people. It has witnessed and hosted many theatre activities. Also, the theater of King Abdulaziz Center for World Culture has around 900 seats, and plan to open in the second half of 2017.

References 

Saudi Arabia